Bascomb is a surname. Notable people with the surname include:

Dud Bascomb, American jazz trumpeter
Neal Bascomb, American journalist and author
Paul Bascomb, American jazz saxophonist
Wilbur "Bad" Bascomb, American jazz musician

See also
Bad Bascomb (film), 1946 Hollywood western movie starring Wallace Beery as Zed Bascomb
Bascom (disambiguation)
Bascome
Bascombe
Baskcomb